Lewis Joel Greene (born August 10, 1934) is an American Brazilian biochemist, scientist, university professor and editor of the Brazilian Journal of Medical and Biological Research.

Greene received a BA in liberal arts from Amherst College in 1955 and a PhD in biochemistry and cell biology at Rockefeller University in 1962. After his doctorate, he went to work for 12 years as a tenured researcher in the Department of Biology at Brookhaven National Laboratory. Upon an invitation to become a visiting scientist as a Fulbright scholar for a year at the Department of Pharmacology of the Faculty of Medicine of Ribeirão Preto of the University of São Paulo (USP) in 1968, Greene and his family decided to return and stay in the country in 1974 and was hired as a professor at the same school, where he is a full professor of cell and molecular biology and head of the Center for Protein Chemistry of Hemocentro de Ribeirão Preto. Greene has trained more than 40 masters and doctoral students and postdoctoral researchers, and has written more than 100 papers in peer-reviewed journals.

Among several honors, he was inducted into the Brazilian Order of Scientific Merit in 2004. He was also a founder and president of the Brazilian Association of Scientific Editors.

Selected publications

External links
Short bio. Brazilian Order of Scientific Merit (in Portuguese)

1934 births
Living people
American biochemists
Brazilian biologists
Brazilian people of American descent
Commanders of the National Order of Scientific Merit (Brazil)
Amherst College alumni
American emigrants to Brazil
Brookhaven National Laboratory staff